Lamellilatirus is a genus of small slug-like sea snails, marine gastropod molluscs in the subfamily Fasciolariinae of the family Fasciolariidae.

Species
 Lamellilatirus boucheti Lyons & Snyder, 2019
 Lamellilatirus ceramidus (Dall, 1889)
 Lamellilatirus corrugatus Lyons & Snyder, 2019
 Lamellilatirus dominiquei Lyons & Snyder, 2013
 Lamellilatirus eburneus Lyons & Snyder, 2013
 Lamellilatirus lamyi Lyons & Snyder, 2013
 Lamellilatirus sunderlandorum Lyons & Snyder, 2013

References

 Lyons W.G. & Snyder M.A. (2013) New Caribbean Lamellilatirus (Gastropoda: Fasciolariidae: Peristerniinae) with a new record of a previously described species. Novapex 14(1): 5-10.

External links
 
 W.G. & Snyder M.A. (2008). New genera and species of Peristerniinae (Gastropoda: Fasciolariidae) from the Caribbean region, with comments on the fasciolariid fauna of Bermuda. The Veliger. 50(3): 225-240

Fasciolariidae